Andrea Rabito (born 11 May 1980) is an Italian footballer who plays as a forward.

Career
Born in Vicenza, Veneto region, Rabito was a youth product of Lombard team A.C. Milan. He was loaned to Serie C1 club Reggiana in 2000–01 and Serie B club Modena in 2001–02, along with Maurizio Domizzi. On 21 June 2002 Rabito and Domizzi were sold to second division club Sampdoria in co-ownership deal for 2,005 million lire (€1.035 million) each. In June 2003 Milan bought back Rabito for undisclosed fee as well as sold Domizzi outright for another €4 million. However Rabito was signed by AlbinoLeffe in 2006 for a €1,000, which after 3 years of amortization, he still had a residual contract value of €957,000 on 15 July on Milan's balance sheet.

In 2001–02, 2002–03 and 2003–04 seasons he won promotion to Serie A with his clubs (but each time transferred to another team before the next season, not getting any top-level experience). For the next few seasons his teams did not have much success.

In 2007, he was signed by Padova in another co-ownership deal for €15,000. In June 2008 Padova acquired him outright for another €45,000.

In the 2008–09 season, he scored a hat-trick in the first game of the season and ended the season second-best Calcio Padova scorer with 9 goals, contributing significantly to Padova getting a promotion to Serie B.

In 2011, he was signed by Cremonese.

References

External links
 

Italian footballers
Italy youth international footballers
A.C. Milan players
A.C. Reggiana 1919 players
Modena F.C. players
U.C. Sampdoria players
U.S. Livorno 1915 players
Ternana Calcio players
Rimini F.C. 1912 players
U.C. AlbinoLeffe players
Calcio Padova players
U.S. Cremonese players
Serie B players
Serie C players
Sportspeople from Vicenza
1980 births
Living people
Association football forwards
Footballers from Veneto